Dürriyə (also, Deruya and Duriya) is a village and municipality in the Astara Rayon of Azerbaijan.  It has a population of 697.

References 

Populated places in Astara District